Geremia Toia (born 19 January 1966) is an Italian equestrian. He competed in two events at the 1984 Summer Olympics.

References

External links
 

1966 births
Living people
Italian male equestrians
Olympic equestrians of Italy
Equestrians at the 1984 Summer Olympics
People from Gallarate
Sportspeople from the Province of Varese